Kelda is a fictional character appearing in American comic books published by Marvel Comics. She is an Asgardian first introduced in Thor vol. 3 #6 (Feb. 2008). Kelda is an original creation by J. Michael Straczynski, not based in Norse mythology. She is most often seen in the company of her human lover, Bill.

Fictional character biography
Not much is known about Kelda before the events of Ragnarök, she is one of the many Asgardians brought back to life by Thor after he recreates Asgard in Oklahoma. She is first seen walking alone, enjoying the Oklahoman night where she meets Bill, a short-order cook at a local diner. Bill later visits Kelda in Asgard, the pair quickly fall in love and consummate their relationship.

After Loki successfully has Thor exiled from Asgard, he manipulates Balder, now king, into moving Asgard to Latveria. Kelda then informs Bill that she wishes to leave with her people and Bill decides to go with her. In Latveria, Bill realizes that Loki has tricked Balder into moving Asgard to the home of Dr. Doom and warns Balder of his suspicions, which are overheard by three of Loki's followers. The three follow Bill outside to confront him, when Kelda appears and conjures a spear made of ice from a passing winter storm for Bill to use to defend himself. Kelda tells the three that spear is poisonous and one cut could kill, which cause them to flee.

After the skirmish, Bill's suspicions are raised and knowing that she cannot curb his curiosity, Kelda gives Bill a sword and tells him to go investigate. Upon reaching Castle Doom, Bill spies Loki and Doom experimenting on an abducted Asgardian. Sensing Bill, Loki sends his followers to kill Bill. Balder reaches the scene just as Bill is fatally wounded and slays Bill's attackers. Balder takes Bill's body back to his camp. There Kelda is informed of her lover's death.

Unable to be consoled, an enraged Kelda storms back to Castle Doom and after a brief exchange with Dr. Doom, she strikes him down with a lightning bolt. However this turns out to only be a robotic decoy. Kelda follows a power cable from the decoy into the castle where she is attacked by the real Dr. Doom. Doom tells Kelda that he is using the power of the Asgardians to create his own immortal army and then kills her by removing her heart.

Meanwhile, Balder assembles his army to siege Castle Doom. Loki also enters the Agardian's camp to claim innocence for the preceding events but is arrested. The Asgardians make their way to the castle where they are met by Doom's new army, a synthesis of abducted Asgardians and machines. Thor having heard the Asgardian call to arms, arrives and joins the battle. Doom having no more use of Kelda throws her body to the Asgardians. Loki tells Balder that he can revive her if he has her heart. Balder agrees and sets Loki free. Thor volunteers to retrieve the heart from the interior of the castle but is halted by Doom's own version of the Destroyer armor. Balder then takes up the task and finds the heart as well as the mutilated bodies of other Asgardians being used to power the Destroyer. Balder finishes off the mutilated Asgardians thus weakening the armor which allows Thor to destroy it. Balder brings the heart to Loki who is then able to revive Kelda.

Kelda brings the news of Bill's death to his parents. They later request she leave them in peace; but she ultimately does so because the forces of Norman Osborn have threatened Bill's parents in order to try to capture her. After the destruction of Asgard following the Siege, Kelda is taken to the Hall of Warriors in Valhalla. It is shaken and damaged but still full of the feasting joyous souls of the slain, which includes Bill. Kelda tries to contact him but cannot. She vows to love him still, despite his death and her life.

Kelda later uncovers Norn Queen Karnilla's plan to take advantage of the new power structure of Asgardia. To cover this up, Karnilla slays Kelda with a rock. Kelda is allowed to enter Valhalla, where she is reunited with her beloved Bill. Their marriage, celebrated in Valhalla, is interrupted by the burning of the World Tree. King Volstagg calls upon Valhalla for reinforcements against their enemies, the legions of Surtur and Vanaheim. Kelda and Bill are at the forefront of this attack.

Powers and abilities
Kelda shares powers common among all Asgardians including enhanced strength, durability, and longevity (through periodic consumption of the golden apples of Idunn).

Kelda also has the power to manipulate weather. In Thor #602, Kelda stated that she controls "the wind and the storm" and summoned a poisonous ice spear from a winter storm. In Thor Giant-Sized Finale, she revealed her name to be Kelda Stormrider and demonstrated the power of flight by turning the lower portion of her body into a tornado.  In Thor #604 Kelda summoned a thunderstorm and generated lightning to destroy Dr. Doom's robotic double.

References

External links
Kelda at Marvel.com
Kelda at Marvel Database

Comics characters introduced in 2008
Marvel Comics Asgardians
Marvel Comics characters who use magic
Marvel Comics characters with superhuman strength
Characters created by J. Michael Straczynski
Fictional characters with weather abilities